The Eldon-Wall Terrace Site is an archeological site in Sweetwater County, Wyoming. The site includes numerous hearth sites, with stone chips and tools. A projectile point dates the site to the Middle Archaic period. The site was listed on the National Register of Historic Places on December 13, 1985.

References

External links
 Eldon-Wall Terrace Site at the Wyoming State Historic Preservation Office

		
National Register of Historic Places in Sweetwater County, Wyoming
Archaeological sites on the National Register of Historic Places in Wyoming